Odell Horton (May 13, 1929 – February 22, 2006) was a United States district judge of the United States District Court for the Western District of Tennessee.

Education and career

Born in Bolivar, Tennessee, Horton served in the United States Marine Corps from 1946 to 1947, and again from 1951 to 1953. He received a Bachelor of Arts degree from Morehouse College in 1951, where he was a member of Alpha Phi Alpha fraternity, and received a Bachelor of Laws from Howard University School of Law in 1956. He was in private practice in Memphis, Tennessee from 1957 to 1962. He was an Assistant United States Attorney of the Western District of Tennessee from 1962 to 1968. He was the director of the Division of Hospital and Health Services for the City of Memphis in 1968. He was a judge of the Shelby County Criminal Court in Tennessee from 1969 to 1970, and was then president of LeMoyne–Owen College from 1970 to 1974, also appearing as a commentator on WREC-TV (CBS) from 1972 to 1974. He was the director of Community Health Services, Mid-South Medical Center Council in Memphis from 1974 to 1976. He then served as a United States Bankruptcy Judge in the Western District of Tennessee from 1976 to 1980.

Federal judicial service

On February 27, 1980, Horton was nominated by President Jimmy Carter to a seat on the United States District Court for the Western District of Tennessee vacated by Judge Bailey Brown. Horton was confirmed by the United States Senate on May 9, 1980, and received his commission on May 12, 1980. He served as Chief Judge from 1987 to 1994. He assumed senior status on May 16, 1995. Horton served in that capacity until his death of respiratory failure on February 22, 2006, in Memphis.

See also 
 List of African-American federal judges
 List of African-American jurists
 List of first minority male lawyers and judges in Tennessee

References

Sources
 

1929 births
2006 deaths
Judges of the United States District Court for the Western District of Tennessee
United States district court judges appointed by Jimmy Carter
20th-century American judges
Heads of universities and colleges in the United States
LeMoyne–Owen College
African-American judges
Morehouse College alumni
Howard University School of Law alumni
People from Bolivar, Tennessee
Tennessee state court judges
Assistant United States Attorneys
Judges of the United States bankruptcy courts